HMNZS Taupo, originally HMS Loch Shin, was a  which served in the Royal Navy during the Second World War, and then in the Royal New Zealand Navy (RNZN) from 1948 to 1961. She was scrapped in 1962.

Service history

Royal Navy service

On Commissioning in October 1944 Loch Shin was allocated for service in the Western Approaches. On 4 February 1945 she participated in attacks on the German submarine , which was sunk. The following month she was allocated for escorting Russian convoys. At the end of the war and during 1946 she was employed on Operation Deadlight to sink captured German U-Boats.

She was paid off from Royal Navy service in June 1947 and was reduced to reserve status.

Royal New Zealand Navy service

In early 1948 Loch Shins sale to New Zealand was negotiated and she was re-fitted at Chatham before sale. Her name was changed to HMNZS Taupo and her pennant number was changed to F421.

During her service with the RNZN she served in the Pacific and Mediterranean and in 1951 and 1952 was deployed for service in the Korean War. Her service included shore bombardment operations. She paid off at the end of 1952 and was held in reserve status at Auckland.

She was sold for scrapping on 15 December 1961.

See also
 Frigates of the Royal New Zealand Navy

References

Bibliography
 
 

 

Loch-class frigates of the Royal New Zealand Navy
Military units and formations of New Zealand in the Korean War